Vidya Vihar Institute of Technology is an engineering college established in 2009 by Vidya Vihar educational trust at Purnea, Bihar. It is affiliated to Aryabhatta Knowledge University, Patna and has approval of AICTE, New Delhi.

History
The college was established in the year 2009 and was recognized by Science and Technology Department, Government of Bihar. It was inaugurated in 2009 as a follow up endeavour of the famous Residential School of Bihar - Vidya Vihar Residential School. The students have consistently topped the Aryabhatta Knowledge University since inception. In 2011-15 batch 1st semester, Nidhi Kumari was state topper in overall branch, in Aryabhatta Knowledge University. In 2011-15 batch, 7th semester exams, Sumit Kumar Singh (ME) was state topper in overall branch with 9.64 SGPA.  The College was a venue of National Conference on Information Science and Technology in March 2014.

References

External links

BCECE Board website
Aryabhatta Knowledge University website
DST, Bihar website

Engineering colleges in Bihar
Purnia
Educational institutions established in 2009
2009 establishments in Bihar
Colleges affiliated to Aryabhatta Knowledge University